Hurricane Ridge is a mountainous area in Washington's Olympic National Park. Approximately  by road from Port Angeles, the ridge is open to hiking, skiing, and snowboarding and is one of the two most visited sites in the national park (along with the Hoh Rain Forest Visitor Center).

In summer, visitors come for views of the Olympic Mountains, as well as for hiking. During the winter months the small, family oriented Hurricane Ridge Ski and Snowboard Area offers lift-serviced downhill skiing and snowboarding.

The road leading west from the Hurricane Ridge visitor center has a number of picnic areas and trail heads. It is not uncommon to find snow on the trails even as late as July. Several other dirt trails of varying distances and difficulty levels branch off of the Hurricane hill trail. The picnic areas are open only in the summer, and have restrooms, water and paved access to picnic tables.

The Hurricane Ridge visitors center offers several conveniences, including an information desk, gift-shop, restrooms, and a snack bar. The exhibits in the visitor center are open year-round, but limited to Friday through Sunday during the winter months.

Hurricane Ridge is named for its intense gales and winds. The weather in the Olympic Mountains is unpredictable, and visitors should be prepared for snow at any time of year. The area receives  of snowfall annually.

History

The Hurricane Ridge Lodge and Hurricane Ridge Road were built in the 1950s as part of a plan by Fred Overly, Olympic National Park's second superintendent, to increase park visitation. The lodge was dedicated by Congressman Henry M. Jackson in September 1952. The lodge's role as a concession facility was replaced in the 1980s with more interpretative uses, focusing on Olympic National Park topics including as geology and wildlife.

Skiing facilities established at Hurricane Ridge were intended to replace those at Deer Park in the 1950s, however in the following decades skiing in national parks was criticized.

The Olympic National Park began restricting winter access to Hurricane Ridge in the late 1990s, which was followed by a decline in visitor numbers.  Park officials restricted winter access to Friday through Sunday in 2005.  In 2011 and 2012, the park agreed to return to its original winter schedule for a trial period after the local community raised $75,000 to bridge the estimated budget gap.  Despite a 35% visitor increase, Olympic National Park officials declared the trial unsuccessful and returned to three-day-a-week access during the winter months.

Climate

Based on the Köppen climate classification, Hurricane Ridge is located in the marine west coast climate zone of western North America. Most weather fronts originate in the Pacific Ocean, and travel east toward the Olympic Peninsula. As fronts approach, they are forced upward by the peaks, causing moisture to drop in the form of rain or snowfall (Orographic lift). As a result, the range experiences high precipitation, especially during the winter months. Hurricane Ridge averages  of snow annually. During winter months, weather is usually cloudy, but due to high-pressure systems over the Pacific Ocean that intensify during summer months, there is often little or no cloud cover during the summer.

Gallery

Summits
Principal summits of Hurricane Ridge from west to east:

References

External links

Hurricane Ridge Ski and Snowboard Area
National Park Service: Visiting Hurricane Ridge
Hurricane Ridge info – outdoorplaces.com
 Hurricane Ridge: weather forecast

Olympic Mountains
Landforms of Olympic National Park
Ridges of Washington (state)